École secondaire de la Pointe-aux-Trembles is a francophone secondary public school located on Sherbrooke East street in the district of Pointe-aux-Trembles, Quebec in Montreal. Part of the Commission scolaire de la Pointe-de-l'Île, it was originally in the Roman Catholic Commission scolaire Jérôme-Le Royer before the 1998 reorganization of school boards from religious communities to linguistic communities in Quebec. This school hosts 1,261 students from sec 1 to 5 (grade 7 to 11) and 90 teachers.

History
The concept of the school was in the spirit of an « open school » with a total area of 25,000 m2 and a maximum capacity of 2,250 students. Therefore, the classrooms were designed for a maximum capacity of 120 students that can be divided for 90, 60 or 30 students. The originality of the concept is based on a central public space spread out on two floors that extend to the other sections divided in 4 blocks. First, a public space and a cafeteria, opening on a terrace and a library; second, 41 classrooms consolidated for academic education; third, workshops and fourth, the Sports Complex including the gymnasium and the swimming pool. For the interior design, raw concrete is used and false ceilings are eliminated. Fenestration is minimal to allow the air-conditioning to create a uniform atmosphere.

The campus
The establishment has three stories and contains mainly regular classrooms, computer labs, science labs, plastic art workshops, a music room, a cafeteria, a library, a gymnasium and a 25 m swimming pool (4 lanes). Also, we can find outdoor facilities located in the parc de la Polyvalente Pointe-aux-Trembles such as a soccer field, a baseball field, two basketball courts and eight tennis courts, a skatepark and a BMX track.

Programs
This school offers, besides regular and special education programs, specialized programs such as Arts and média, Multi-sports, Music, Outdoor and Science and technologies.

Student services
Many professional services are offered to the students: nurse, psychologist, social worker, guidance counsellor, psychoeducator, orthophonist, leisure technician, special education technician, intervention worker for student retention, supervisors, etc. Finally, a homework assistance program is offered after school.

References

External links
 École secondaire Pointe-aux-Trembles 
  

High schools in Quebec